Ziruza Tasmagambetova (Ziruza Saparğaliqyzy Tasmağambetova; born 10 January 1997),  known professionally as Ziruza, is a Q-pop singer, songwriter and actress. The first video clip was  released in 2017 for the song "Айт ендi".

Discography

Albums

Music videos

References

External links 
 
 
 
 
 

Kazakhstani pop singers
21st-century Kazakhstani women singers
People from Kostanay Region